Schloss Johannisberg is a castle and winery in the village of Johannisberg to the west of Wiesbaden, Hesse, in the Rheingau wine-growing region of Germany. It has been making wine for over 900 years. The winery is most noted for its claim to have "discovered" late harvest wine. The palace is a venue of the Rheingau Musik Festival, made available by co-founder Tatiana von Metternich-Winneburg.

History 

A mountain on the north bank of the Rhine near Mainz has been associated with the church and with winemaking since the Middle Ages, when the estate of Louis the Pious made 6000 litres of wine during the reign of Charlemagne. In 1100, Benedictine monks completed a monastery on the Bischofsberg ("Bishop's mountain), having identified the site as one of the best places to grow vines. Thirty years later they built a Romanesque basilica in honour of John the Baptist, and the hill became known as Johannisberg ("John's mountain"). It was constructed on floor plans similar to that of its mother house, St. Alban's Abbey, Mainz. The monastery was a prime target for the Anabaptists in the German Peasants' War of 1525, and it was destroyed.

In 1716, Konstantin von Buttlar, Prince-Abbot of Fulda, bought the estate from Lothar Franz von Schönborn, started construction of the baroque palace, and, in 1720, planted Riesling vines, making it the oldest Riesling vineyard in the world. The estate changed hands several times during the Napoleonic Wars, but in 1816 Francis II, Holy Roman Emperor, gave it to the great Austrian statesman Prince von Metternich.

In 1942, the Schloss was bombed and reduced to a shell by the air raids on Mainz in 1942. By the mid-1960s it had been largely rebuilt by Paul Alfons von Metternich-Winneburg and his wife Princess Tatiana, who had fled there on a farm cart in 1945 after the Russians had advanced on their other estates. Prince Paul died in 1992, leaving no heir, but a significant portion of his fortune to his mistress. With his death the House of Metternich became extinct. Although Princess Tatiana was allowed to reside in the Schloss until her death in 2006, the situation had forced her husband to sell the estate to the German Oetker family in 1974. There are currently about 35 hectares (86 acres) of vineyard.

Late harvest wines 
Tradition has it that on one occasion a messenger from Heinrich von Bibra, Prince-Bishop and Abbot of Fulda, was 14 days late in bringing the papers to give the cellar master permission to start harvesting the grapes. At least two alternative stories exist to explain the delay. One is that the Prince-Bishop was away hunting and was not available to sign the permission to harvest, and the other is that he was intercepted and held by highwaymen. By this time the grapes had become affected with the "noble rot" Botrytis cinerea. The rotted grapes were then given to the local peasants, who ended up making wine of high quality. In 1775, Schloss Johannisberg made the first Spätlese Riesling followed by an Auslese wine in 1787 and an Eiswein in 1858. Unfortunately for the German tradition, the Tokay classification of 1730 relied in part on an area's propensity to noble rot, which suggests that the Hungarians got there first.

Historically the estate used different colour seals for grapes of different ripeness. These classifications were used as the basis for the new German wine classification of 1971, thus :

Schloss Johannisberg is a single vineyard designation (Einzellage) in its own right, and one of a handful historic German vineyards which do not have to display a village name on the label. Thus, the vineyard designation on the label is Schloß Johannisberger.

Weingut Schloss Johannisberg is a member of the Verband Deutscher Prädikatsweingüter (VDP).

Geology 
The 35 ha of vineyards consist of a loam-loess topsoil lying on Taunus quartzite. The soils are quite stony and gravelly, enabling them to retain the day's temperature and to buffer temperature fluctuations.

Visitors 
The estate offers guided tours with tastings, a wine bar, shop, and various special events.

Basilica 

The church, Basilika, was originally built for the Benedictine monastery and dedicated to St. Johannes (St. John the Baptist). After the destruction during World War II it was rebuilt as a Romanesque basilica and has served as the Catholic parish church for the village Johannisberg. It is also used for concerts of sacred music, of local groups and for concerts of the Rheingau Musik Festival, such as a performance of the Huelgas Ensemble.

In 1999, combined choirs of Geisenheim and St. Martin, Idstein, performed Giacomo Puccini's Messa di Gloria and, in 2001, Rutter's Requiem and Benjamin Britten's The Company of Heaven for speakers, soloists, chorus and orchestra (1937, not performed again until 1989). In 2009, the Neue Rheingauer Kantorei performed Haydn's Die Schöpfung with soloists Elisabeth Scholl, Daniel Sans and Andreas Pruys.

Music venue 
The Ostflügel (East Wing) was rebuilt after the destruction to serve as a tennis court. Tatiana von Metternich-Winneburg, a co-founder of the Rheingau Musik Festival, turned the hall into a public concert venue, staging 10 of the 19 concerts of the first summer season in 1988, and many recitals and chamber music performances every year following. After her husband's death the hall was named "Fürst-von-Metternich-Saal". von Metternich-Winneburg was "Vorsitzende des Kuratoriums" (president of the festival's curators) until her death. The tradition has been continued by the present owners. Spanish flamenco guitarist Paco de Lucia for instance performed there in June 2012.

References

External links 

  

Wineries of Germany
Vineyards of Germany
Benedictine monasteries in Germany
Buildings and structures in Rheingau-Taunus-Kreis
Tourist attractions in Hesse
House of Metternich
Johannisberg
Dr. Oetker
Rheingau